BB18 may refer to:

USS Connecticut (BB-18)
 BB18, a postcode district in the BB postcode area
Big Brother 18, a television programme in various versions